Dynasty is the second album by the extreme metal band As They Sleep. The album is the first to feature Drummer Tony Lukitsh.

Critical reception
Nick Habisch of Sputnik Music states:
"Overall, As They Sleep has released a very solid Death Metal album. Encasing melody and brutality within the same set of songs, the band puts out a very talented and engaging album, sure to please fans of bands such as The Black Dahlia Murder, or other related acts. I highly recommend Dynasty, and it will become a staple of my collection for quite some time." He gave the album a 4.5 Star rating out of 5 Stars.

Steve at Indie Vision Music says: "This is one of the best pure metal albums released this year. It is hard to believe that a band with this much talent could slip through the cracks for so long, but they are here now and ready to kick your teeth in. With the pummeling drums to the nasty riffs, Dynasty lays a good old-fashioned beat down on you. If you love death metal, do yourself a favor and go buy this album when it comes out on Monday November 22." He gave the album 4 Stars out of 5.

Concept and Lyrical Themes
Dynasty is concept album. As stated by Vocalist Aaron Bridgewater, the album talks about the rise and fall of ancient civilizations up to present time. The song "The Third Reich", for instance, talks about Adolf Hitler's squadron and how they massacred many people in their strikes. The song "To the Republic" talks about the United States Economy and far the Government has fallen from God.

Track listing

Credits

As They Sleep
 Aaron Bridgewater - Vocals
 Nick Morris - Guitars, Producer, Engineer
 Barry Gomez - Guitars
 Derek Kosiba - Bass
 Tony Lukitsh - Drums
Production
 Troy Glessner - Mastering
 Brian Kroll - A&R
 Ronn Miller - Mixing Assistant
 Jason Suecof - Mixing
Art
 Ryan Clark - Design
 Jerad Knudson - Photography

References

2010 albums
Solid State Records albums
As They Sleep albums
Concept albums